Snail is usually one of almost all members of the molluscan class Gastropoda which have coiled shells.

Snail may also refer to

Music
"Snail" (song), a 2020 song by Benee
"Snail", a song by The Smashing Pumpkins from the 1991 album Gish
Snails (EP), a 2005 EP by The Format
Snails (DJ) (born 1988), Canadian DJ and producer
The Snails, an American rock band

Other uses
Snails (video game), a 2002 shooting game by PDAMill for the Pocket PC
Snail (company), a Chinese video game company
Snail (advertisement), a 2004 television advertisement for Guinness Extra Cold
SNAI1, or Snail, protein-coding gene
The Snail, a 1953 collage by Henri Matisse
A slang term for the power source of some rotary snowplows
A spiral-shaped cam, used in striking clocks and other mechanisms
SNAIL (Superconducting Nonlinear Asymmetric Inductive eLements), a device based on Josephson junctions used in quantum superconducting circuits

See also
Brian the Snail, a snail in the English version of the French children's television programme The Magic Roundabout
Finger Snail, a possible pharaoh of prehistoric Egypt whose existence is questioned
Gary the Snail, a character in the Nickelodeon animated 1999 TV series SpongeBob SquarePants
Les Escargots (The Snails), a 1965 animation by René Laloux
Snail darter, a small fish native to east Tennessee
Snail Maze, a 1986 video game by Sega, part of the Sega Master System
Snail kite, Rostrhamus sociabilis, a bird of prey within the family Accipitridae